Rongo Herehere Wetere  of Ngāti Maniapoto descent, founder of the Te Wananga o Aotearoa (TWoA) tertiary institution in New Zealand and an Officer of the Order of New Zealand of Merit. He was previously chair of the Māori Employment and Training Commission.  He was the chief executive of the Te Wananga o Aotearoa tertiary institution but resigned from his post in 2005 following government pressure. A subsequent report by the Office of the Auditor-General found that the finances of the TWoA were in order despite the university being Indigenous.

In 1994, Dr. Wetere had successfully gained government approval for the establishment of New Zealand’s first Maori University known as Te Wananga o Aotearoa (translation:
University of New Zealand) and became its founding President/CEO. Within 10 years Te Wananga o Aotearoa (TWOA) grew to be the largest tertiary provider in New Zealand with annual enrolments reaching 65,000 students. TWOA also allowed the enrollment of non-Maori people with 52% of its student body being non-Maori.

In 1998 Dr Wetere sued the New Zealand government over inequitable funding for Wananga (Maori University). Eventually the three Maori Wananga received $150M capital
funding from this action and an apology from the Government was made for their refusal to provide funding. When the following year enrolments jumped to 65,000, New Zealand Universities facing declining rolls sought Government action to restrict TWOA. During a heated national election political parties challenged the government for having allowed the TWOA to grow so large. At the resignation of Dr. Wetere in December 2005 the former Minister of Education and then Chair of the Tertiary Funding Commission (TEC), the Honourable Russell Marshall stated, “Dr. Wetere had made an enormous contribution to education in New Zealand and was deserving of the highest accolades the country could bestow.

He was also a key driver in the establishment of WINHEC (World Indigenous Nations Higher Education Consortium) in Banff in 2002 where he was appointed Co-Chair. WINHEC groups all the Indigenous universities around the pacific rim for the sharing of ideas as well as certification and establishment of standards. 

Wetere currently works as Managing Director of ArrowMight Canada, an adult literacy and lifelong learning provider that targets Immigrants and Aboriginal learners.

In the 1996 Queen's Birthday Honours, Wetere was appointed an Officer of the New Zealand Order of Merit, for services to the community.

Personal life
Wetere has three children is married to Marcia Krawll and resides in Ottawa, Ontario, Canada.

References

New Zealand educators
New Zealand Māori public servants
Living people
Ngāti Maniapoto people
Officers of the New Zealand Order of Merit
Academic staff of Te Wānanga o Aotearoa
Year of birth missing (living people)